Bartoszek is a Polish surname. Notable people with the surname include:

Danuta Bartoszek (born 1961), Polish-Canadian long-distance runner
Maciej Bartoszek (born 1977), Polish football manager
Pawel Bartoszek (born 1980), Icelandic mathematician and politician

See also
 Bartosz

Polish-language surnames